The Pauk class is the NATO reporting name for a class of small patrol corvettes built for the Soviet Navy and export customers between 1977 and 1989. The Russian designation is Project 1241.2 Molniya-2. These ships are designed for coastal patrol and inshore anti-submarine warfare. The ships are fitted with a dipping sonar which is also used in Soviet helicopters.

Ships

Soviet Navy / Russian Navy
29 ships were built for the Soviets, of which one (Sokol) remain in service with the Russian Coast Guard as of 2022. Kuban was scrapped in Crimea in March 2021 https://fleetphoto.ru/vessel/43073/

Export

Bulgarian Navy

Two ships transferred in 1989/90 - Bodri (Brisk) and Reshitelni (Decisive)

Cuban Navy

One ship in service.

Indian Navy

A plan to license-produce more units in India was abandoned in favor of the indigenous . Ships named:
INS Abhay (Fearless)
INS Ajay (Unconquerable)
INS Akshay (Indestructible)
INS Agray (Aggressive)

Abhay is the last ship of the class in service as of 2022.

Ukraine

Ukrainian Navy
Two ships transferred, U207 Uzhhorod (now decommissioned) and U208 Khmelnytskyi (taken over Russia).

Ukrainian Sea Guard
Three ships are in service with the Ukrainian Sea Guard.

 BG-50 Hryhoriy Kuropyatnykov - in active service
 BG-51 Poltava 
 BG-52 Hryhoriy Hnatenko
	
Both Poltava and Hryhoriy Hnatenko were ready to be decommissioned and were left in Balaklava after the Russian annexation of Crimea; their fate is unknown

See also
List of ships of the Soviet Navy
List of ships of Russia by project number

Gallery

References

  Also published as

External links

  All Pauk Class Corvettes - Complete Ship List

 
Corvette classes
Corvettes of the Soviet Navy
Corvettes of the Russian Navy
Corvettes of the Indian Navy
Corvettes of the Bulgarian Navy
Corvettes of the Cuban Navy
Corvettes of the Vietnam People's Navy